Raymond Bruneau (June 12, 1917 – July 5, 1971) was an Ontario translator and political figure. He was a member of the House of Commons of Canada representing Prescott and defeating the 24-year incumbent Liberal MP, Élie-Oscar Bertrand, to sit as an Independent Liberal from 1949 to 1953. He sat for Glengarry—Prescott as a Liberal from 1953 to 1957.

He was born in Hawkesbury, Ontario in 1917, the son of Joseph Bruneau. He studied political science and constitutional law at the University of Ottawa. In 1944, he married Marie-Thérèse O'Rourke. Bruneau worked in Ottawa as a translator in the federal public service. He was unsuccessful in attempts at reelection in 1957, 1958 and 1963.

References 
 Histoire des Comtes Unis de Prescott et de Russell, L. Brault (1963)

External links 

Stormont, Dundas and Glengarry, 1945-1978, O & F Marin (1982)

1917 births
1970 deaths
Liberal Party of Canada MPs
Independent Liberal MPs in Canada
Members of the House of Commons of Canada from Ontario
Franco-Ontarian people
People from Hawkesbury, Ontario